St Mary's Church is a Grade I listed parish church in the Church of England in Mildenhall, Suffolk.

History
The church is mostly 14th century.  Simon Jenkins awarded the church 4 stars in his 'England's Thousand Best Churches'.

Memorials
Sir Henry Barton, Lord Mayor of London 1416 and 1428. Cenotaph. South aisle. 
Sir Henry North (d.1620) alabaster tomb chest with effigies of him and his family. South aisle.
Roger North, d.1651 and Thomasina North, d.1661. Wall tablets
Sir Henry North (d.1671) . Wall tablet. Chancel arch.
Sir Henry Warner (d.1617) and Edward Warner, and to Mary Warner (d.1601). Wall tablet. Chancel. 
William Coe (diarist) (d.1729). A floor slab in the vestry.
Henry Bunbury (d.1722). Wall tablet. South aisle.
Revd. John Hunt (d.1736). Wall tablet. Chancel.

Parish status
The Parish of Mildenhall is part of the Mildenhall Team Ministry, along with the Parishes of: 
St Mary the Virgin's Church, Barton Mills
St John's Church, Beck Row with Kenny Hill
St Laurence & St Peter's Church, Eriswell
St Andrew's Church, Freckenham
St Ethelbert's Church, Herringswell
St James's Church, Icklingham
St Christopher's Church, Red Lodge
St Mary & St Andrew's Church, Tuddenham with Cavenham
St Andrew's Church, Cavenham
St Peter's Church, West Row
All Saints' Church, Worlington

Bells
The church has a ring of 10 bells with the largest 8 bells cast at the Whitechapel Bell Foundry by Mears & Stainbank between 1887 and 1913. The ring was augmented to 10 with addition of 2 new trebles in 1946 cast by Gillett & Johnston in celebration of peace for the end of the World War II. The bells hang in steel & cast iron frame made by Mears & Stainbank and installed at the same time as the bells 4 to 9 were rehung in 1914. The tower is affiliated to the Suffolk Guild of Ringers.

Organ
The church has a two manual pipe organ dating from 1865 by Father Henry Willis. A specification of the organ can be found on the National Pipe Organ Register.

References

Church of England church buildings in Suffolk
Grade I listed churches in Suffolk
Mildenhall, Suffolk